Traditional Persian is one of several names for a group of cats that are considered to be essentially the original breed of Persian cat, before the variety was selectively bred to have extreme features. Other everyday usage names are: Doll Face Persian, Classic Persian,  Old Fashioned Persian, Long-nosed Persian, Old-style Longhair, Traditional Longhair and Original Longhair.

The physical appearance of this domestic cat breed barely changed when compared to photos dating back to the late 1800s. However, since some breeders in the United States and other parts of the world introduced the brachycephalic mutation into the breed, the short nose and clear break became shorter and higher. This resulted in the modification of the original Persian breed standard so that modern show quality Persians must have peke-faces. This resulted in the breed disappearing from cat shows.

However, this older form of Persian cat is immortalized in popular films such as You Only Live Twice and Enter the Dragon.

Origin
Persian cats originate from Persia (Iran). The cats were introduced in Europe in the 1500s as highly valued items of trade. The Europeans were impressed by the Persian's long silky coat and purposefully bred the cats to perpetuate the trait.

Genetic mutations in Persians

Two mutations of note influenced the Persian cats: the color inhibitor gene (1882) that gave rise to the so-called "chinchilla" coat and the brachycephalic mutation (circa 1942) that gave rise to the so-called "peke-faced" or "snub-nosed" Persian cats.

Chinchilla color mutation
The color inhibitor gene mutated in a Persian cross in 1882 in the UK in a cat called "Chinnie". The offspring of this mutation that express the gene are commonly known as "chinchillas" presumably due to the resemblance of their coat to that of the rodent by that name. They were classified as a Persian variety for breeding purposes.

Brachycephalic mutation
The brachycephalic mutation in the Persian breed occurred during World War II in the US. This led to a concerted effort to breed Persians with rounder heads and smaller ears than their ancient ancestors after World War II. The resultant brachycephalic heads lead to the much desired snub noses favored by many modern Persian breeders and which dictates the modern standard for Persians in cat fancies throughout the world.

Color breeding in chinchilla varieties
The sub-set of chinchilla varieties experienced problems during the brachycephalic modernization phase with regards to the original chinchilla coloring features. These included loss or incomplete lip- and nose liners; patched-colored paw pads and eye color faults. Once lost, it is hard, if not impossible, to recover.

By the mid-1950s, concerned breeders of chinchilla in the US advocated pure color breeding. A key person in this regard was Jeanne Ramsdale, author of the book "Persian Cats and Other Longhairs".

Breed recognition history up till 2010
Despite the non-conformance to the modern Persian breed standards, some breeders, and in particular those that practiced controlled color-breeding, continued to breed and register their original longhair cats.

The following attempts were made to restore the original longhairs as breed in their own right, namely:

 Sterling in the International Cat Cat Association (TICA) (Feb 1994 - Sep 1995), and continued in the International Cat Exhibitors (ICE) in 1998;  
 Chinchilla Longhair in the South African Cat Council (SACC) in 1996; 
 Traditional Longhair (silver and golden) in the World Cat Federation (WCF)  in 2010.

Sterling standard
There is some confusion around the name "Sterling". 
In the International Cat Association (TICA), there were some American Shorthair breeders who bred to Persians to obtain their lovely silver color and green eyes. The kittens were pretty to look at but did not meet the true American Shorthair type. Jane Martinke noticed the effect the outcrosses had on the American type and coat as well as the attractiveness of the kittens. She proposed a new breed, called the "Sterling" because of their lovely silver color. These new cats were to look just like Persians but with a short, dense plush coat. The name was changed to "Exotic Shorthair" when all colors got accepted in 1979.

In September 1992 the "English Sterling" as a New Breed was presented by Jeanne Johnson at the TICA 13th Annual Meeting. Follow-up work resulted in the breed with the name "Sterling" (without 'English' in front) was accepted as Category 1 in TICA in Feb 1994. (Category 1 in TICA means "Established Breeds".) The Sterling had Category 1 status only for 18 months, before it was scrapped in total by TICA in September 1995. The assumed reason is that there was a lack of buy-in from enough fellow breeders as required by TICA breed recognition rules. Despite this set-back, Jeannie Johnson continued by getting the "Sterling" accepted by the International Cat Exhibitors (ICE) for championship status in 1998. The breed had its own registry under the International Sterling Society. However, not many breeders of chinchilla Persian elected to switch over from the existing Persian standard to the new Sterling standard. Mrs Johnson died in 2006 before she could get wider buy-in for the breed. Due to lack of support, this Sterling breed does not exist anymore.

Chinchilla Longhair standard
In South Africa, all breeds cat judge and Chinchilla breeder Stella Slabber, headed up a project to separate the breed from the modern Persian standard. This standard was only to be applicable to color-bred silvers, commonly known as "Chinchillas" in South Africa.  The breed was accepted under the name "Chinchilla Longhair" with breed code "CHL" in the SA Cat Council (SACC) in 1996.

Traditional Longhair standard for silver and golden varieties
A global standard for the "Traditional Longhair silver and golden, shaded and tipped varieties" was accepted by the WCF in August 2010. The breed proposal was compiled in Cape Town by Alida Delport. The facilitator of the breed recognition process was Dr. Johan Lamprecht, who also did the breed proposal presentation at the WCF. Nestle Purina sponsored the breed recognition show due to these cats being the brand animal used in their cat food advertisements world-wide.

The initial standard that was proposed at the 2010 WCF breed recognition show in Cape Town was based on the SACC standard with a request to include the golden varieties. After consultation with the Chairperson of the WCF Standard- and Judges Commission, Cornelia Hungerecker, the breed name was changed to "Tradition Longhair". One other minor differentiation was that the eye shape should read "walnut shaped" instead of "round".

Breed recognition history post-2010

The 2010 standard for Traditional Longhair silver and golden varieties was extended by the World Cat Federation (WCF) in 2012 to include all Persian color varieties.

In 2014 the World Cat Federation (WCF) changed the name "Traditional Longhair" to "Original Longhair".

The World Cat Congress promotes better understanding and co-operation among the world's major cat associations in matters of mutual interest and concern. It has nine members. In 2014, after a webinar, a project was started to obtain breed recognition of the Original Longhair in all WCC members.

References

Cat breeds
Cat breeds originating in Iran
Natural cat breeds